Malacoctenus ebisui, the Fishgod blenny, is a species of labrisomid blenny native to the Pacific coast of the Americas from the Gulf of California to Panama.  This species can reach a length of  TL. The specific name refers to Ebisu, a Japanese god of fishermen, as does the common name.

References

External links
 

ebisui
Fish of Mexican Pacific coast
Western Central American coastal fauna
Fish described in 1959
Taxa named by Victor G. Springer